Selwyn Romilly  (born 1939 or 1940) is a Canadian retired judge. He was appointed to the Supreme Court of British Columbia in November 1995, becoming the first Black judge named to that court.

Early life 

He attended the Queen's Royal College in Port-of-Spain and shortly thereafter immigrated to Canada.

Education  

Romilly received a Bachelor of Arts from University of British Columbia (UBC) and entered law school in 1963, earning his LLB from the Peter A. Allard School of Law in 1966. At the time, Romilly was only the fourth Black student to have entered law at UBC.

Law career 
Following his education, Romilly practised as a lawyer from 1967 until 1974. He first worked in Kamloops, and then Prince Rupert. He eventually relocated to Smithers.

In 1972, Romilly was offered a seat on the bench of the provincial court of the province by Deputy Attorney General Dave Vickers but turned the offer down. Romilly was offered the position again and was then appointed as a judge of the Provincial Court of British Columbia, effective November 15, 1974. He served until 1978. He was the first Black person to be appointed a judge at this level of court.

In November 1995, Romilly was appointed to the Supreme Court of British Columbia, becoming the first Black judge named to that court. He retired from the Supreme Court in 2015.

In August 2003, Romilly ordered the extradition of former SS guard Michael Seifert from Canada to Italy for a conviction of war crimes taken part at Bolzano Transit Camp during World War II.

Racial profiling incident 

On May 14, 2021, Romilly was wrongfully detained by officers of the Vancouver Police Department while out on a morning walk. The officers were looking for a "dark-skinned" suspect in his 40s or 50s.

Following the incident, Vancouver Mayor Kennedy Stewart apologized to Romilly, condemning systemic racism present in the police force.

Romilly, speaking with Global News, said:

Personal life  

Romilly moved to Smithers, British Columbia, where he married his wife Lorna. They have two children.

Awards and honours 
 1996 – Congress of Black Women of Canada, for public service
 1997 – Canadian Association of Black Lawyers, award
 2008 – Black Law Students Association of Canada, distinguished public service award

References 

20th-century Canadian judges
21st-century Canadian judges
Living people
University of British Columbia alumni
Year of birth missing (living people)